As of December 2022, the Japanese public debt is estimated to be approximately 9.8 trillion
US Dollars (1.29 quadrillion yen), or 263% of GDP, and is the highest of any developed nation. 43.3% of this debt is held by the Bank of Japan.

Japan's asset price bubble collapse in 1991 led to a prolonged period of economic stagnation described as the "lost decade", with GDP falling significantly in real terms through the 1990s. In response, the Bank of Japan set out in the early 2000s to encourage economic growth through the non-traditional policy of quantitative easing. By 2013, Japanese public debt exceeded one quadrillion yen (US$10.46 trillion), which was about twice the country's annual gross domestic product at that time, and already the largest debt ratio of any nation. 

The public debt of Japan has continued to rise in response to a number of challenges, including but not limited to the Great Recession in 2008, the Tōhoku earthquake and tsunami and Fukushima nuclear disaster in 2011, and the COVID-19 pandemic in between January 2020 and October 2021, (which also held ramifications for Tokyo's hosting of the 2020 Summer Olympics). In August 2011, Moody's rating cut Japan's long-term sovereign debt rating by one notch to Aa3 from Aa2 in line with the size of the country's deficit and borrowing level. The large budget deficits and government debt since the 2008-09 global recession and the Tohoku earthquake and tsunami in March 2011 contributed to the ratings downgrade. In 2012, the Organisation for Economic Co-operation and Development (OECD) Yearbook editorial stated that Japan's "debt rose above 200% of GDP partly as a consequence of the tragic earthquake and the related reconstruction efforts." Former Prime Minister Naoto Kan called the situation "urgent" due to the ballooning debt.

Addressing public debt 
In order to address the Japanese budget gap and growing national debt, the Japanese National Diet, at the urging of Prime Minister Yoshihiko Noda of the Democratic Party of Japan (DPJ), passed a bill in June 2012 to double the national consumption tax to 10%. This increased the tax to 8% in April 2014. The originally scheduled 10% tax increase to be implemented in October 2015 was delayed until at least October 2019. The final increase to 10% was implemented on October 1, 2019. The goal of this increase was to halt the growth of the public debt by 2015, although reducing the debt would require further measures. The DPJ subsequently lost control of the Diet in late 2012, and Noda's successor Shinzo Abe of the Liberal Democratic Party implemented the "Abenomics" program, which involved an additional 10.3 trillion yen of economic stimulus spending to balance out the negative impact of the consumption tax increase on economic growth.

Abenomics led to rapid appreciation in the Japanese stock market in early 2013 without significantly impacting Japanese government bond yields, although 10-year forward rates rose slightly. Around 70% of Japanese government bonds are purchased by the Bank of Japan, and much of the remainder is purchased by Japanese banks and trust funds, which largely insulates the prices and yields of such bonds from the effects of the global bond market and reduces their sensitivity to credit rating changes. Betting against Japanese government bonds has become known as the "widowmaker trade" due to their price resilience even if fundamental analysis indicates the contrary should be true.

Notwithstanding the stability of the market for Japanese government debt, the cost of servicing Japan's public debt uses up half of the state's tax revenues, and the cost of importing energy in the wake of the 2011 Fukushima disaster has also negatively impacted Japan's longstanding current account surplus.

History 
In 1944, during the Pacific War, the amount of governmental debt exceeded  by 260%.

In 1947, during postwar economic chaos, the amount of bonds the government issued exceeded tax revenue. Later, it was thought that this was the root cause of postwar inflation, and the Japanese government enacted the Public Finance Act of Japan in response.  The act established a balanced fiscal policy by prohibiting: 1) the issuance of government bonds to cover national debt, and, 2) the Bank of Japan from buying government bonds. Since the establishment of the 1955 System, the amount of held valuable securities in the bank – especially national bonds – had risen significantly. However, the 1965 budget issued 259 billion yen in deficit-covering bonds, and the next year's budget in 1966 allotted 730 billion yen in construction bonds. By 1990, the government did not issue a national bond due to the Japanese asset price bubble. Bonds were issued again in 1994, and have been issued every year since.

In 1995 (Heisei 9), Masayoshi Takemura, the former finance minister, declared the Declaration of Fiscal Crisis by issuing deficit-covering bond with higher frequency.

National bond issuing and economic policy 

During the Japanese asset price bubble of the late 1980s, revenues were high due to prosperous conditions, Japanese stocks profited, and the amount of national bonds issued was modest. With the breakdown of the economic bubble came a decrease in annual revenue. As a result, the amount of national bonds issued increased quickly. Most of the national bonds had a fixed interest rate, so the debt to GDP ratio increased as a consequence of the decrease in nominal GDP growth due to deflation.

The growth of annual revenue was slowed down by the prolonged depression. Consequently, the governments started issuing additional national bonds to cover the interest payments. This national bond is called renewal national bond. As a result of issuing these bonds, the debt is not actually repaid, and the amount of bonds issued continued to grow. Japan has continued to issue bonds to cover the debt since the asset price bubble collapse.

There was the phase that opportunity to act austerity policy rose when the fear for return (repayment) principal of interest was close-upped at any trouble happened. But, the policy was acted, that was the inadequate fiscal action by the government and bring finance under control by the Bank of Japan, when critical recession caused by austerity policy and others. There was the opinion that suggested a fear for general situation of the economic structure, that the Japanese economy experienced deflation caused by globalization and the growing international competition. These factors steered the direction of Japanese economic policy, hence, the perceived harmful impact to the economic strength of the country.

With the above-mentioned view point from the mobilizing of finances by the government or the action to monetary squeeze by the BOJ, or, from the view point that it has been deflation recession caused by long termed low demand, there are criticisms that it also cause an effect hurt power of economy the tend to promote  increase efficiency of supply side. On the other hand, there are following suggestions for that criticisms:
 Paul Krugman suggested that the opportunity cost of investment has been greater than the ROI, and that the quantitative easing policy has not been effective. He said that printing notes will not work if the country is in a liquidity trap.
 , an economist suggested that the issue of decline in the economic growth rate has been beyond the ability of monetary policy.

Direct purchase of government bonds by Bank of Japan 
A policy was planned and enacted in which the national central bank would directly buy the national bonds.

Economist Kazuhito Ikeo stated, "Quantitative easing and debt monetization are different from each other. We must not assume they are the same just because both involve the Bank of Japan buying government bonds. 'Lending money' is clearly different from 'giving money', but we just see the money move from one place to another, and they look exactly the same in that aspect.

The Public Finance Act 
The Public Finance Act prohibits the Bank of Japan from buying government bonds directly. Nevertheless, according to the provision, it is allowed to buy when the National Diet approves the bill. These regulations result from reflection that the Bank of Japan brought about violent inflation by their public bond purchases during the period from before to just after the War.

See also
 Monetary and fiscal policy of Japan
 List of countries by public debt
 Net international investment position

External links

References

Government of Japan
Government finances in Japan
 
Government debt by country